Grand Valley State University (GVSU, GV, or Grand Valley) is a public university in Allendale, Michigan. It was established in 1960 as Grand Valley State College. The university also features campuses in Grand Rapids and Holland and regional centers in Battle Creek, Detroit, Muskegon, and Traverse City.

GVSU enrolls more than 24,000 students as of fall 2021 from all 83 Michigan counties and dozens of other states and foreign countries. It employs more than 3,000 people, with about 1,780 academic faculty and 1,991 support staff. The university has alumni from 50 U.S. states, Canada, and 25 other countries.

GVSU's NCAA Division II sports teams are the Lakers and they compete in the Great Lakes Intercollegiate Athletic Conference (GLIAC) in all 19 intercollegiate varsity sports. They have won 20 NCAA Division II National Championships since 2002 in seven different sports.

History

Formation, planning and construction
In 1958 the Michigan Legislature commissioned a study that demonstrated a need for a four-year college in the Grand Rapids area, Michigan's second largest metropolitan region. Local businessman Bill Seidman created a committee to study the report and spearhead the planning and promotion to create such an institution. In the following year the Michigan Legislature established the college. A naming contest was held, and out of 2500 submissions, "Grand Valley State College" was chosen. Private donations, including $350,000 to purchase land and $1,000,000 for construction, were secured from 5,000 individuals, organizations, and business throughout West Michigan. In 1961, the Grand Valley State College Board of Control chose a  site in Ottawa County near the Grand River for the new campus, and construction of academic buildings began the following year.

Early years
Grand Valley State College accepted its first class of 225 students in 1963 and held its first graduation of 138 students on June 18, 1967. The middle-late 1960s saw the addition of the first dormitories and construction of new academic buildings, including the Zumberge Library, named for the university's first president, James Zumberge.

In 1969, the Grand Valley Lanthorn printed an issue containing several vulgarities and obscenities. After complaints from some at Grand Valley State College and the surrounding communities, the Ottawa County, Michigan, sheriff arrested the editor, and the prosecutor closed down the newspaper office. The university, then a co-ed college, sued the sheriff and prosecutor for closing the Lanthorn offices. Eventually, Michigan's Attorney General settled the case out of court, siding with the college because the Lanthorn's content was considered covered by Freedom of Speech.

During the 1970s Grand Valley organized its academic units into several colleges: College of Arts and Sciences, Thomas Jefferson College, William James College, Seidman College of Business, and College IV. Michigan Governor William Milliken signed the law changing the institution's name to Grand Valley State Colleges in 1973. However, the "s" was dropped and the name was reverted to Grand Valley State College in 1983 when the academic programs were reorganized into divisions.

College to comprehensive university
In 1987 the Michigan Legislature passed a law renaming the college to Grand Valley State University. The 1980s and 1990s saw addition of satellite campuses or centers in downtown Grand Rapids, Muskegon, Holland, and Traverse City. In 2004, the university's board reorganized the university structure again into a college system consisting of the College of Liberal Arts and Sciences, College of Interdisciplinary Studies, College of Community and Public Service, College of Education, College of Health Professions, Kirkhof College of Nursing, Seidman College of Business, and Seymour and Esther Padnos College of Engineering and Computing. Grand Valley completed its first 50 years with a comprehensive campaign that raised almost $100 million from over 17,000 donors, making it the university's largest campaign to date. Money raised during the campaign has helped fund many construction projects on campus, including the Mary Idema Pew Library and the L. William Seidman Center.

Continued growth beyond 50th anniversary
In 2012, GVSU announced several more construction projects and land purchases. Future buildings to be constructed include a new biology laboratory building and an addition and renovation to the Zumberge Library on the Allendale campus. Land purchases in 2012 included property in downtown Grand Rapids adjacent to the medical mile for healthcare program expansion. In 2013, GVSU announced it would add on to Au Sable Hall and construct a building to house the GVSU Laker Store (known as University Bookstore prior to April 2015), with expanded dining facilities.

Campuses and centers

Grand Valley has three campuses: the main campus in Allendale and two satellite campuses in the surrounding area. Smaller centers in Muskegon, Detroit and Traverse City also exist.

The Interurban Transit Partnership operates several The Rapid bus routes under contract with the university. The public can ride these buses by paying the fare, but rides are free to Grand Valley students, faculty and staff on all Rapid routes with a valid I.D. card.

Allendale campus

The university's main and original campus in Allendale is the site of most of the university's programs. The Allendale campus is composed of 1,322 acres perched above the Grand River next to a system of ravines and is divided into two areas, north and south campus, separated by West Campus Drive. State highway M-45 links the campus in suburban Allendale to US Highway 31/Lake Michigan to the west and Grand Rapids, Michigan to the east. Lubbers Stadium, the GVSU Fieldhouse and all other athletic facilities for the school's 19 varsity sports are also on the Allendale campus. The campus is dotted with many sculptures, including works by Dale Eldred, Joseph Kinnebrew and James Clover. Academic facilities on the Allendale campus include 122 classrooms, 144 research laboratories, 20 lab prep rooms, 21 computer labs, and the Mary Idema Pew Library Learning and Information Commons. The Allendale campus is also home to the Kindschi Hall of Science, a science facility that opened in the fall of 2015.

The Holton-Hooker Learning and Living Center, with space for 490 students, opened in August 2016. The building is LEED silver-certified.

Robert C. Pew Grand Rapids Campus
The  Robert C. Pew Grand Rapids Campus is in the heart of downtown Grand Rapids and on the banks of the Grand River. It consists of 11 buildings and three leased spaces and includes the Richard DeVos Center, L.V. Eberhard Center, Cook-DeVos Center for Health Sciences, L. William Seidman Center, Beckering Family Carillon Tower, The Depot (houses the Michigan Small Business and Technology Development headquarters), Hauenstein Center for Presidential Studies, Keller Engineering Laboratories, John C. Kennedy Hall of Engineering, Peter F. Secchia Hall (housing), Winter Hall (housing), and the Van Andel Global Trade Center. Winter Hall is typically occupied by graduate students and is fully furnished along with appliances. These facilities include 57 classrooms, 78 research laboratories, 23 lab prep rooms, 11 computer labs, and the Steelcase Library.

Health Campus

The  Health Campus is a part of the Grand Rapids Medical Mile area and houses many of GVSU's health programs. The Cook-DeVos Center for Health Sciences (CHS), which opened in 2003, reached capacity in 2011. To accommodate the growth in the health sciences, GVSU completed the $37.5 million Raleigh J. Finkelstein Hall north of the Cook-DeVos Center for Health Sciences, and in 2018 broke ground on the next phase, the Daniel and Pamella DeVos Center for Interprofessional Health, a $70 million building that is attached to the Cook-DeVos Center for Health Sciences and includes a parking structure shared with nearby Spectrum Health.

Meijer campus in Holland
The Meijer Campus, just outside downtown Holland, MI was opened in 1998 and was named for the Meijer Family for their generous donation of land.

Muskegon centers
GVSU has three locations in Muskegon:
 James L. Stevenson Center for Higher Education at Muskegon Community College was established in the fall of 1995 as a joint venture between GVSU, Ferris State University, and Western Michigan University. The center offers several GVSU graduate and undergraduate programs.
 Lake Michigan Center, which houses the Annis Water Resources Institute (AWRI).
 The Michigan Alternative and Renewable Energy Center (MAREC), which is the first fully integrated demonstration facility for distributed generation of electricity using alternative and renewable energy technologies in the United States.

Traverse City center
The Traverse City Regional Center was established in the fall of 1995 and is at the NMC University Center in a partnership with Northwestern Michigan College. The center offers undergraduate and graduate degrees in education, social work, and liberal studies.
The GVSU Physician Assistant program enrolls 10-14 students at the TC campus.

Detroit center
The Detroit Center was established in 2012 when GVSU purchased the Barden Building adjacent to Comerica Park in downtown Detroit, Michigan to house its charter school offices. The center also houses the Southeast Michigan Region of the Michigan Small Business & Technology Development Center, of which GVSU is the supervisor.

Organization and administration

Administration
Grand Valley State University is governed by an eight-member board of trustees, whose members are appointed by the Governor of Michigan and confirmed by the Michigan Senate for terms of eight years. This setup is provided for by the constitution of the state of Michigan of 1963. Members of the board serve without compensation. The board appoints the president of the university, formulates university policies, controls university finances, and acts as the supreme governing body of the institution. The president of the university administers the policies of the board of trustees.

Funding and financial
GVSU's general fund budget is $351 million, of which $275 million is from tuition and $72 million is from state appropriations. As of 2019, Grand Valley's amount of university-based student financial aid was $289 million, including $90 million of that in scholarships and grants. During the 2013–2014 academic year, full-time dependent students received an average award of $13,276.

Public safety 
The Grand Valley Police Department provides law enforcement services for the Allendale Campus. While the department is self-empowered to enforce its jurisdiction, officers are also deputized by the Ottawa County Sheriff's Department. Because Allendale doesn't have a police department, the Grand Valley State University Police can handle cases anywhere in Ottawa County, mainly in Allendale and the area surrounding the campus. The department handles other security issues, such as parking and driving violations, community policing, as well lost and found. Allendale Fire Department serves the campus. The Department of Public Safety also employs several students who assist the department by performing a variety of clerical and security based duties and services.
The Pew Campus Security and Regional Centers is an entity distinct from the Department of Public safety, and handles security and public safety issues for the Grand Rapids Pew Campus and all Regional Centers including the Holland (MI) Meijer Campus, the Muskegon (MI) campus and the Traverse City (MI) campus. This department is not sworn or certified and relies on the Grand Rapids Police Department and other local law enforcement agencies for official law enforcement when necessary.

Student government
Student government at Grand Valley is formally known as Student Senate. There are 50 student senators that serve on one of seven different committees. Student Senate offices are in the Kirkhof Center on GVSU's Allendale campus.

Academics

Grand Valley State University is a large, primarily residential comprehensive university that has a large undergraduate enrollment and emphasis. GVSU offers over 200 areas of study, including 82 undergraduate majors and 36 graduate programs that include 74 graduate emphases and certificate programs at the certificate, bachelor's, post-bachelor's, master's, post-master's, and doctoral levels. GVSU conferred 4,448 undergraduate degrees and 1,033 graduate degrees in 2012–2013. Its most popular undergraduate majors, by 2021 graduates, were:
Biomedical Sciences (262)
Health Professions and Related Clinical Sciences (250)
Exercise Science and Kinesiology (250)
Marketing/Marketing Management (226)
Psychology (226)
Registered Nursing/Registered Nurse (208)
Finance (205)

Grand Valley's student body consists of 21,636 undergraduates and 3,458 graduate students across all campuses and centers with the majority being on the Allendale campus (as of Fall 2014). The fall 2014 incoming freshman undergraduate class of 4,199 students, represented 80 Michigan counties, 23 states, and 20 countries. 86% of first year students live on campus: 3,591 freshman chose to live on-campus in fall 2014, while 608 chose to live off-campus. As of fall 2014, more than 400 international students were enrolled at the university representing 82 countries.

Undergraduate admissions 

GVSU's undergraduate admissions are classified as "more selective" by U.S. News & World Report as Grand Valley admitted 69% of applicants for the 2008–2009 school year. For the Class of 2025 (enrolling Fall 2021), GVSU received 17,163 applications and accepted 15,730 (91.7%), with 3,807 enrolling. The middle 50% range of SAT scores for enrolling freshmen was 1010-1230. The middle 50% ACT composite score range was 21-27.

Colleges

The university consists of seven degree-granting colleges:
 F.E. Seidman College of Business
 College of Education and Community Innovation
 College of Liberal Arts and Sciences
 Seymour and Esther Padnos College of Engineering and Computing
 College of Health Professions
 Kirkhof College of Nursing
 Brooks College of Interdisciplinary Studies

GVSU is also home to the Frederik Meijer Honors College, which is non-degree-granting but is meant to provide a more challenging interdisciplinary education in a learning-living environment. The honors college is in the Glenn A. Niemeyer Learning and Living Center on the south side of the Allendale campus.

Study abroad
The Padnos International Center collaborates with students who wish to study abroad. Grand Valley has more than 4,000 study abroad programs, both affiliated with and independent from GVSU, from which students can choose.

In 1995 Peimin Ni established GVSU's Shanghai, China study abroad program, and by the 2000s he and Geling Shang co-lead it. Word of mouth and announcements in classes were used to promote it. Daniel Golden, author of Spy Schools: How the CIA, FBI, and Foreign Intelligence Secretly Exploit America's Universities, stated that the organizers initially had trouble finding interested students.

Rankings

U.S. News & World Report ranked Grand Valley third in the "Top Public Regional Universities in the Midwest" category and 26th in the "Regional Universities (Midwest) tier 1" category for 2014.

US News & World Report noted in its "Best Colleges 2011" that 98 percent of Grand Valley graduates find employment or pursue advanced degrees after graduation.

Research

During the two years prior to October 2009 university researchers engaged in over 186 research projects funded by more than $32.7 million in grants. Grand Valley's Annis Water Resources Institute conducts research on water resources, including: ecosystem structure and function, contaminants and toxicology, hydrology, land use, watershed, stream, and wetland ecology, water quality, and basic and applied limnology. GVSU's Michigan Alternative and Renewable Energy Center (MAREC) recently received funding for its $3.7 million Lake Michigan Offshore Wind Assessment Project to test wind energy on Lake Michigan. The research should take three years as a floating buoy will be used and moved to collect data from different locations on the lake.

Accreditation
Grand Valley as an institution is accredited by the Higher Learning Commission. Grand Valley also has baccalaureate program accreditation with AACSB, ABET, APTA, CSWE, NASAD, NASM, NCATE, and NLN.

GVSU and MSU partnerships
The Michigan State University College of Human Medicine maintains the Secchia Center, a medical campus in downtown Grand Rapids. Along with GVSU and two Grand Rapids hospitals, it is a founding member of the Grand Rapids Medical Education Partners. This partnership allows "educational opportunities for residents, fellows, practicing physicians, physician assistants, nurses and students in other health professions."

The Early Assurance Program reserves spaces in MSU's medical program for top-performing GVSU pre-medical graduates. One of the program's goals is to select first-generation college students, students from underprivileged areas, and students who have expressed a desire to work in high-demand medical specialties. Students entering the program must agree to work in under-served areas after they complete their medical degrees. The first group of six students entered this program during the fall 2010 semester.

The two universities have announced a joint program specializing in clinical trial management, aimed at providing the foundations for carrying out clinical drug trials in West Michigan. It is an online certificate program, and was started due to requests from local drug trial companies. The program was set to begin for the fall semester of 2011.

University libraries
The mission of the Grand Valley State University libraries is to "enrich the educational mission of the university by advancing intellectual growth and discovery. Through the acquisition, application, dissemination, and preservation of knowledge we strive to serve the community, the state, the nation, and the world."

Library locations
Each library's collection is tailored to its location and the programs it serves, with daily deliveries between sites.
 Mary Idema Pew Library (Allendale)
 Seidman House (Allendale)
 Steelcase Library (Grand Rapids)
 Frey Foundation Learning Center (Grand Rapids)
 Curriculum Materials Library (Grand Rapids)

Library services
The university libraries offer opportunities for research, collaboration, and individual study. Collectively, the libraries subscribe to over 60,000 print and electronic journals. They also house more than 1,482,633 books including more than 829,463 electronic books.

Collections
Government resources and maps

Grand Valley is a recipient of United States government documents and receives 44% of the documents distributed by the Federal Depository Library Program.

Curriculum Materials Library (CML)
The Curriculum Materials Library in the DeVos Center downtown houses instructional materials for preschool through grade twelve and provide spaces where education majors can preview resources, develop lesson plans, create media for the classroom, and try out teaching aides.

Special Collections & University Archives
Seidman House on the Allendale Campus houses the University Archives, which include extensive collections of rare books and Michigan novels, the Harvey Lemmen Collection on Abraham Lincoln, the Young Lords project on line at Young Lords in Lincoln Park , the largest Latino oral history collection in the Mid-West by Jose Cha Cha Jimenez, and the American Civil War, and the papers of acclaimed Michigan author Jim Harrison. There is also an Anthony Powell collection, consisting of the many editions of Dance to the Music of Time, his other novels, a complete run of the Anthony Powell Society Newsletters and its journal, Secret Harmonies.

Art Galleries and Collections
A collection of over 15,000 works of art features public sculpture, prints and drawings, American Impressionism, Aboriginal art, Indian art, world photography, contemporary art, and more. Artists represented in the collection range from GVSU faculty, students, and alumni; to regional Michigan artists; to nationally and internationally renowned artists. Most of the collection is on view and can be found throughout university buildings on campuses in Allendale, Grand Rapids, Holland, Muskegon, Traverse City, and Detroit.

Digital Collections
The Digital Collections database contains a selection of photographs, correspondence, diaries, interviews, and publications from the holdings of the Libraries' Special Collections & University Archives, and other University entities.

Dorothy A. Johnson Collection for Philanthropy and Nonprofit Leadership
The Dorothy A. Johnson Collection is a collection on philanthropy, volunteerism, and nonprofit leadership. It is considered to be one of the most comprehensive in the United States and is the only one of its kind in Michigan.

Allendale campus library
Construction of a new library on the Allendale campus began in May 2011 and finished in the Spring 2013. The $70 million,  facility holds 150,000 books. It also has an automated storage and retrieval system that can handle 600,000 volumes. The library is named the Mary Idema Pew Library Learning and Information Commons, after the late Mary Idema Pew. The U.S. Department of Energy announced the library used part of the $21 million allocated for technical assistance projects to improve energy use in commercial buildings. The library was one of only 24 projects in the United States receiving the assistantships that was funded by the American Recovery and Reinvestment Act.

Athletics

The Grand Valley State Lakers are the intercollegiate athletic teams of Grand Valley State University. The GVSU Lakers compete at the NCAA Division II level and offer 20 varsity sports including 11 for women and 9 for men. The university participates in and is a founding member of the Great Lakes Intercollegiate Athletic Conference (GLIAC). Grand Valley's varsity athletic teams have won 15 national championships in seven sports and have been national runners-up thirteen times in eight sports. GVSU has also won the prestigious National Association of Collegiate Directors of Athletics (NACDA) Directors' Cup for NCAA Division II schools thirteen times: in 2004 thru 2011, 2014 thru 2017 and 2019. The Lakers also have six second-place finishes in 2002, 2003, 2012, 2013 and 2018. The cup is awarded to the top athletic programs based on overall team national finishes. Grand Valley is the first college east of the Mississippi River to win the Director's Cup for NCAA Division II.

Mascot
The official mascot of Grand Valley State is Louie the Laker.

Fight song
"GVSU Victory!", which is sometimes referred to as "Grand Valley Victory", is the fight song for the Grand Valley State University Lakers.

Arts

Fine arts
GVSU has a National Association of Schools of Art and Design (NASAD) accredited art program, including emphases in illustration, graphic design, ceramics, printmaking, painting, visual studies, and sculpture. Art students attend classes at the Calder Art Center, named for contemporary artist Alexander Calder. The building includes exhibition space under the name of the Stuart & Barbara Padnos Art Gallery.

Admission into the GVSU art program requires an initial review of the potential student's work. Admitted students then undergo a series of foundation classes that properly introduce them to the formal basics of art. Passing the foundation review allows access to higher level art studies, and a choice of approaching an emphasis. Subsequent reviews may take place depending upon emphases, including both junior and senior level reviews.

Music
The music program at Grand Valley State University offers various performing ensembles, including 3 performing bands, an orchestra, several small performance ensembles, and the 230-piece Laker Marching Band and adjunct athletic bands. The Performing Arts Center (PAC) houses numerous rehearsal spaces, classrooms, labs, offices, practice halls, two dance studios, a theatre workshop, and the Louis Armstrong Theatre, along with the new Sherman Van Solkema recital hall. This space is of use to music, dance, and theater majors at Grand Valley.

In 2016, new renovations to the PAC were expected to begin, with construction scheduled to be finished in 2017. These include the addition of a small black box theater, new study spaces, rehearsal space, and labs, along with cosmetic renovations.

New Music Ensemble
The New Music Ensemble (NME), directed by Bill Ryan, has released two critically acclaimed CDs, the first a recording of Steve Reich's Music for 18 Musicians, which appeared on the Billboard Classical Crossover chart, and the second entitled In C Remixed, a remix project of Terry Riley's In C, which featured the work of some of the top electronic composers and DJs in the world, including Todd Reynolds, Michael Lowenstern, and Pulitzer prize winner David Lang. The NME performed at Le Poisson Rouge in New York City on November 2, 2009 and previously at the 2007 Bang on a Can festival.

Trumpet ensemble
Directed by Richard Stoelzel, Grand Valley's trumpet ensemble has been a top competitor in the National Trumpet Competition for nearly a decade, placing first in the ensemble division in 2006 and 2008. The ensemble has commissioned four pieces by composer Erik Morales since 2005, two of which went on to become the winning pieces, and one of which is still unpremiered. The trumpet ensemble has performed twice during the International Trumpet Guild's summer conferences in 2007 and 2009.

Student life
The Office of Student Life at GVSU is in the Kirkhof Center near the center of the Allendale campus. Its offices are home to the Community Service Learning Center, Fraternity and Sorority Life, Laker Leadership Programs, Major Campus Events and Traditions, Student Organizations, and the Transitions Orientation Program.

Fraternity and sorority life
GVSU has 30 fraternities and sororities. As of the winter of 2016, the GVSU fraternity and sorority community consisted of 1600 undergraduate members, representing approximately 7.8% of the undergraduate population.

Fraternities

 Interfraternity Council (IFC)
 Alpha Epsilon Pi
 Alpha Tau Omega
 Delta Tau Delta
 Sigma Pi
 Theta Chi
 Pi Kappa Phi
Phi Kappa Tau Colony
 Multicultural Greek Council (MGC)
 Sigma Lambda Beta
 Phi Iota Alpha
 National Pan-Hellenic Council (NPHC)
 Alpha Phi Alpha
 Phi Beta Sigma
 Omega Psi Phi

Sororities

 National Panhellenic Conference (NPC)
 Alpha Sigma Alpha
 Alpha Omicron Pi
 Delta Zeta
 Alpha Sigma Tau
 Sigma Kappa
 Sigma Sigma Sigma
 Phi Sigma Sigma
 Phi Mu
 Gamma Phi Beta
 Multicultural Greek Council (MGC)
 Sigma Lambda Gamma
 Delta Phi Lambda
 Sigma Lambda Upsilon
 Delta Lambda Lambda
 National Pan-Hellenic Council (NPHC)
 Alpha Kappa Alpha
 Delta Sigma Theta
 Sigma Gamma Rho
 Zeta Phi Beta

Honorary and professional organizations

 Delta Sigma Pi – Professional Fraternity Association
 Order of Omega – national fraternity and sorority life leadership, honorary
 Omicron Delta Kappa – national collegiate leadership, honorary
 Alpha Phi Omega – national coed service fraternity
 Kappa Kappa Psi – national honorary bands fraternity
 Sigma Alpha Iota – national music fraternity for women
 Phi Mu Alpha Sinfonia – national music fraternity
 Beta Alpha Psi – international honorary organization for finance, accounting, and information systems
 Phi Sigma Pi – national honor fraternity
 Phi Chi Theta – professional coed business fraternity
 Alpha Kappa Psi - professional coed business fraternity

Sustainability

Sustainability is listed as the seventh of Grand Valley's core values. The institution's Office of Sustainability Practices provides best "practices in administration and campus operations, educational opportunities, student involvement, and community engagement." Notable programs include a community garden near the Allendale campus that also serves as a laboratory for interdisciplinary learning called the Sustainable Agriculture Project and the Sustainability Reinvestment Fund distributed in the form of mini-grants to students and staff with ideas that can improve the ecological footprint of the campus and community.

The university has created a formal climate action plan and set a goal to reduce its 2006 level of greenhouse gas emissions 20% by 2020. The university's sustainability efforts were awarded a "A−" by the Sustainable Endowments Institute for 2011. Grand Valley's overall sustainability grade is the highest amongst the nine Michigan universities that were surveyed and the 28th best in the nation. In other rankings GVSU was placed as high as 16th in the world and tenth in the United States for its sustainability efforts and environment-friendly university management by Universitas Indonesia GreenMetric World University Ranking for 2011.

The university is home to eleven Leadership in Energy and Environmental Design (LEED) buildings or building additions. Several more buildings including the new Mary Idema Pew Library are in construction or planning stages to be LEED certified as well. All new construction and major renovations at GVSU must meet LEED standards required by the university. As of 2019 there have been 25 LEED certified projects completed at Grand Valley. $2.2 million is saved annually on Grand Valley's energy bill through a combination of energy conservation efforts and LEED construction projects.

The Student Environmental Coalition or SEC, is the student-run sustainability organization on campus. The mission of the group is "Helping to engage students at Grand Valley's campus to be conscious citizens by promotion of environmental awareness."

Additionally there are several academic programs offering the study of sustainability. Those housed in the College of Liberal Arts and Sciences include Geography and Sustainable Planning (major and minor) and Natural Resource Management (major and minor). Those housed in the Brooks College of Interdisciplinary Studies include the Liberal Studies major and the Environmental Studies minor.

Grand Valley hosted meetings relating to sustainability, including a summit in which various sustainability issues were explored by university officials and local experts in April 2010, and a meeting of the Michigan Great Lakes Wind Council in July 2010 to discuss offshore wind energy generation.

Media
GVSU has a variety of media outlets offered to its campuses.

The Grand Valley Lanthorn is the student-run newspaper, published on Mondays and Thursdays during the academic year. Copies of the paper are free and available at both the Allendale and Grand Rapids campuses in designated newsstands and online. Until the fall of 2006, the paper was only published once per week. 8,000 copies of the paper are published per issue totaling 16,000 copies per week.

GVSU has several electronic media outlets including three radio stations and three television stations. The university owns and operates its own Public Broadcasting Service (PBS) Public television station WGVU-TV in Allendale, Michigan and WGVK-TV, its full-time satellite station in Kalamazoo, Michigan. In addition, GVSU also operates a National Public Radio (NPR) station in WGVU-FM with the same call letters, which feature a mixture of jazz, blues, and news, including local and NPR programming. WCKS ("The Whale") is the student-run radio station, broadcasting over the internet and Tunein. Grand Valley TV (GVTV) is the student-run television station on channel 46.1 on the university cable system, while uploading its content to YouTube.

Student organizations
As of fall 2016, GVSU has over 486 student-run organizations. Student organizations include categories in, but are not limited to, Academic and Professional, Student Life Sports, Cultural, Honorary, Interfaith and Religious, Media, Performing Arts, Service and Advocacy, and Special Interests.

Housing and residence life

Grand Valley State University is home to 29 living centers (residence halls) and three on-campus apartment complexes on its main Allendale campus, and two residence halls on its Pew Grand Rapids campus, totaling 6,068 beds. GVSU also has six individual dining halls on campus for students and faculty. These dining halls are housed in five facilities with five halls being on the Allendale campus and one on the Pew campus. GVSU also has many on campus job opportunities. In 2016–2017, 7280 students were employed on campus and averaged a wage of $2,261 that year.

Notable people

See also

 List of colleges and universities in Michigan

References

External links

 
 Grand Valley State Athletics website

 
Public universities and colleges in Michigan
Allendale, Michigan
Education in Ottawa County, Michigan
Education in Grand Rapids, Michigan
Education in Grand Traverse County, Michigan
Education in Muskegon County, Michigan
Universities and colleges in Kent County, Michigan
Holland, Michigan
Muskegon, Michigan
Traverse City, Michigan
Educational institutions established in 1960
1960 establishments in Michigan
Tourist attractions in Ottawa County, Michigan
Universities and colleges accredited by the Higher Learning Commission